Pramud Hettiwatte (born 15 May 1995) is a Sri Lankan cricketer. He made his first-class debut for Badureliya Sports Club in the 2016–17 Premier League Tournament on 2 December 2016.

Pramud was educated at Nalanda College, Colombo.

References

External links
 

1995 births
Living people
Sri Lankan cricketers
Badureliya Sports Club cricketers
Nondescripts Cricket Club cricketers
Nugegoda Sports and Welfare Club cricketers
Alumni of Nalanda College, Colombo
Cricketers from Colombo